Frederic Remington High School is a rural public high school located north of Brainerd, Kansas between Whitewater and Potwin at NW Meadowlark Rd and NW 90th St.  It is one of three schools operated by Remington USD 206 public school district.  This school is also commonly known as Remington High School as the shorter name, and Whitewater-Remington High School on KSHSAA sport lists.

History
In 1961, Whitewater, Potwin, Brainerd, Elbing, Furley, Countryside, and Golden Gate schools merged to form a joint rural high school. Heated opposition between Whitewater and Potwin occurred during the discussion for the location of the new high school. Rural voters pushed for a centralized location in neither town. A public vote was taken to determine if the school should be built halfway between Whitewater and Potwin, near Brainerd, which passed 745 "yes" to 155 "no". A contest was held to find a unique name for the new high school, which was chosen to honor the famous American Old West artist Frederic Remington who lived about 4 miles north in the 1880s.

In 2006, the Remington Rock monument was built near the high school.

Extracurricular Activities
The Broncos compete in the Heart of America League. The KSHSAA classification is 2A. The school also has a variety of organizations for the students to participate in.

Athletics
The Broncos compete in the Heart of America League and are classified as a 2A school, except in football, where Remington is classified in 1A. Frederic Remington High School offers the following sports:

 Fall Sports
 Cross Country
 Football
 Volleyball

 Winter
 Basketball
 Wrestling

 Spring
 Baseball / Softball
 Golf
 Track and Field

Organizations
 Debate and Forensics
 Family, Careers, and Community Leaders of America (FCCLA)
 International Club
 National Forensics League
 Scholars' Bowl
 Science Club
 Student Council (STUCO)
 Table Top Gaming Club
 Thespians/Drama
 Young Adults Advisory Council to the Library (YAACL)
 Skills USA
Cheerleading

Notable alumni
Former Whitewater High School
 Hattie Louthan (1865–1950), writer, author of five books and contributed to newspapers and magazines.

See also

 List of high schools in Kansas
 List of unified school districts in Kansas

References

Further reading
 Frederic Remington, the Holiday Sheepman; Peggy and Harold Samuels; Kansas History: A Journal of the Central Plains; 12 pages; Vol 2, No 1, Spring 1979.
 Plum Grove, Brainerd, Whitewater, and Potwin from 1870 to 1900; Roland H. Ensz; Emporia State University; 134 pages; 1970.
 History of Butler County, Kansas; Vol P Mooney; Standard Publishing; 869 pages; 1916.

External links
 Official school website
 USD 206, school district
Historical
 Frederic Remington Area Historical Society
Maps
 USD 206 School District Boundary Map, KDOT
 Butler County Map, KDOT

Public high schools in Kansas
Schools in Butler County, Kansas
Educational institutions established in 1961
1961 establishments in Kansas